The Amphidontidae are a family of extinct mammals from the Early Cretaceous, belonging to the triconodonts. It contains most of the species previously belonged to Amphilestidae.

Phylogeny 
Cladogram after Marisol Montellano, James A. Hopson, James M. Clark (2008) and Gao et al. (2010).

Taxonomy
Based on the works by Mikko Haaramo and the Palaeofile website.
Family †Amphidontidae Simpson 1925
Genus †Acinacodus Lopatin, Maschenko & Averianov 2010
Species †Acinacodus tagaricus Lopatin, Maschenko & Averianov 2010
Genus †Aploconodon Simpson 1925
Species †Aploconodon comoensis Simpson 1925
Genus †Comodon Kretzoi & Kretzoi 2000 non Stein 1859 [Phascolodon Simpson 1925; Phascolotheridium Cifelli & Dykes 2001]
Species †Comodon gidleyi (Simpson 1925) Kretzoi & Kretzoi 2000 [Phascolodon gidleyi Simpson 1925; Phascolotheridium gidleyi (Simpson 1925) Cifelli & Dykes 2001]
Genus †Hakusanodon Rougier, Isaji & Manabe 2007
Species †Hakusanodon archaeus Rougier, Isaji & Manabe 2007
Genus †Juchilestes Gao et al. 2009
Species †Juchilestes liaoningensis Gao et al. 2009
Genus †Amphidon Simpson 1925 
Species †Amphidon superstes Simpson 1925 
Genus †Gobiotheriodon Trofimov 1997 [Gobiodon Trofimov 1980 non Bleeker 1856]
Species †Gobiotheriodon infinitus (Trofimov 1980) Trofimov 1997 [Gobiodon infinitus Trofimov 1980]
Genus †Manchurodon Yabe & Shikama 1938
Species †Manchurodon simplicidens Yabe & Shikama 1938
Genus †Nakunodon Yadagiri 1985
Species †Nakunodon paikasiensis Yadagiri 1985

References

Early Cretaceous first appearances
Early Cretaceous extinctions
Prehistoric mammal families
Taxa named by George Gaylord Simpson